The Lake Hodges Bridge is a component of Interstate 15 that spans Lake Hodges in San Diego, just south of the city limits of Escondido, California. Lake Hodges Bridge is an important part of San Diego's north–south transportation axis.

The original bridge was constructed in 1919. The bridge later became integrated into the newly constructed U.S. Route 395. As part of a roadway realignment and improvement project, the original structure was demolished in 1968, and replaced with a new structure in 1969. That bridge was subsequently replaced in 1981, when I-15 was built to supersede US 395.

As a traffic bottleneck, the bridge is vulnerable to traffic jams in North San Diego County. The nature of the lake and the surrounding land makes the bridge the singular access into the city of San Diego from inland North County. The only two major ways around the bridge are the Del Dios Highway, a two-lane winding road to Interstate 5 via Del Mar, and the  trip through Ramona into Escondido. Although paved access roads through the San Pasqual Valley to the east of Lake Hodges do exist, they are lightly traveled and are not designed to handle heavy traffic. The bridge is thus effectively the only crossing point for drivers on the route.

The current bridge is a concrete viaduct. It was widened and replaced in 2006-2009 as part of a project to add managed lanes in the I-15 corridor.

Depending on the amount of rainfall in San Diego County, Lake Hodges's water level fluctuates significantly. As such, Lake Hodges Bridge may cross over water or a dry lake bed from time to time. Due to the vast amount of vegetation that springs up when water levels are low, the area below the bridge has been jokingly referred to as "Hodges National Forest".

Lake Hodges Pedestrian Bridge 
The Lake Hodges Pedestrian Bridge, officially named the David Kreitzer Lake Hodges Bicycle Pedestrian Bridge after a retired planning commissioner, is a pedestrian bridge spanning Lake Hodges immediately south of the Interstate 15 span. The bridge was opened to the public on May 15, 2009.

The bridge is of a stress-ribbon design, the longest of its type in the world, and only the sixth to have been built in the US. From end to end the bridge measures . This design was chosen for having the least impact on environmentally sensitive habitats in the construction area.

See also 
 bicycle bridge

References

Bridges in San Diego
Bridges on the Interstate Highway System
Road bridges in California
Interstate 15
Bridges completed in 1919
Bridges completed in 1969
Bridges completed in 1981
Bridges completed in 2009
Buildings and structures demolished in 1968
Concrete bridges in California
Stressed ribbon bridges in the United States
1919 establishments in California